is a Japanese politician of the Liberal Democratic Party (LDP), a member of the House of Representatives in the Diet (national legislature). A native of Takatō, Nagano and graduate of Hosei University, he studied abroad in Berlin and then at Ohio State University. He was elected to the House of Representatives for the first time in 1972 as an independent and later joined the New Liberal Club, which later merged with the LDP.

References

External links 
 Official website 

|-

|-

|-

1941 births
Living people
Politicians from Nagano Prefecture
Ohio State University alumni
Members of the House of Representatives (Japan)
New Liberal Club politicians
Liberal Democratic Party (Japan) politicians
Hosei University alumni
21st-century Japanese politicians